Esa is a masculine given name of Finnish origin and a surname. People with the name include:

Given name

A–N
 Esa Åkerlund (born 1969), convicted Finnish serial killer
 Esa Hietanen (1896–1962), Finnish journalist and politician
 Esa Holopainen (born 1972), Finnish guitarist for Amorphis
 Esa Itkonen (born 1944), Finnish linguist, philosopher and academic
 Esa Jokinen (born 1958), Finnish athlete
 Esa Kaitila (1909–1975), Finnish academic and politician
 Esa Keskinen (born 1965), Finnish ice hockey player
 Esa Klinga (born 1939), Finnish skier
 Esa Lehikoinen (born 1986), Finnish ice hockey player
 Esa Lepola (born 1948), Finnish swimmer
 Esa Lindell (born 1994), Finnish ice hockey player
 Esa Misri (born 1971), Indian bodybuilder
 Esa Murtoaro (born 1966), Finnish wrestler

O–Z
 Esa Pakarinen (1911–1989), Finnish actor and musician
 Esa Pakarinen Jr. (born 1947), Finnish actor
 Esa Pekonen (born 1961), Finnish football player and manager
 Esa Peltonen (born 1947), Finnish ice hockey player
 Esa Piironen (born 1943), Finnish architect
 Esa Pirnes (born 1977), Finnish ice hockey player
 Esa Pulkkinen (born 1957), Finnish army officer
 Esa Rinne (born 1943), Finnish athlete
 Esa Saarinen (born 1953), Finnish philosopher and academic
 Esa Saario (born 1931), Finnish actor
 Esa-Pekka Salonen (born 1958), Finnish orchestral conductor and composer
 Esa Seeste (1913–1997), Finnish gymnast 
 Esa Skyttä, Finnish racing cyclist
 Esa Tapani (born 1968), Finnish musician
 Esa Terävä (born 1987), Finnish football player
 Esa Tikkanen (born 1965), Finnish ice hockey player
 Esa Utriainen (born 1953), Finnish javelin thrower
 Esa Vuorinen (born 1945), Finnish cinematographer

Surname
 Lou Esa (born 1952), American boxer

Finnish masculine given names